Brian McMahon (born 15 July 1939) is a former Australian rules footballer who played with St Kilda in the Victorian Football League (VFL).

McMahon was recruited from South Warrnambool and played 10 senior games for St Kilda, in the 1962 and 1963 VFL seasons.

References

External links
 
 

1939 births
Australian rules footballers from Victoria (Australia)
St Kilda Football Club players
South Warrnambool Football Club players
Living people